The Recherche en Prévision Numérique center (RPN) is responsible for the research and development of the modelling component of the Numerical Weather Prediction (NWP) System for the Canadian Meteorological Centre (CMC) and the Regional Meteorological Centers of the Meteorological Service of Canada (MSC), Environment Canada (EC).

External links 
 Recherche Prévision Numérique 

Meteorological Service of Canada